Lo'ay Omran Al-Zaideh is a Jordanian footballer who plays as a forward for Sahab.

Honors and Participation in International Tournaments

In WAFF Championships 
2008 WAFF Championship

International goals

With U-20

With Senior

References
 Omran Signs Up for Al-Hussein (Irbid)

External links 
 
 

1988 births
Association football midfielders
Jordanian footballers
Jordan international footballers
Living people
Al-Jazeera (Jordan) players
Al-Hussein SC (Irbid) players
Shabab Al-Ordon Club players
Al-Baqa'a Club players
Al-Ahli SC (Amman) players
Sahab SC players
Jordanian Pro League players